In music, Op. 247 stands for Opus number 247. Compositions that are assigned this number include:

 Milhaud – Symphony No. 2
 Strauss – Grillenbanner